Pakistan Software Export Board (PSEB) is an apex Government body mandated to promote Pakistan's IT Industry in local and international markets. PSEB facilitates the IT industry through a series of projects and programs. PSEB was established through an executive order vide Cabinet Division's notification dated 12 June 1995.

Mission 

PSEB's mission is to strengthen and promote the IT industry of Pakistan both locally and globally and to make  Pakistan the second largest IT exporter in South Asia.

Major functions 
Primary functions of PSEB are to

 Undertake research and study on the state of the Information and Communication Technology (ICT) sector and propose strategies for fast track and sustainable development of the Pakistan IT industry including software and services, IT enabled services, and hardware in both export and domestic markets.
 Study the laws and regulations of various competitor countries and propose improvements and modifications in Pakistan public policy impacting the IT industry in the light of Pakistan's requirements.
 Register IT companies in Pakistan and propose and provide fiscal, regulatory and corporate incentives and facilitation to them. Act as a one-stop shop to cater to all the needs of an IT company for setting up or facilitating its IT business ventures in Pakistan. Act as a bridge between the private IT companies and the various government bodies.
 Work with telecom regulators and operators to reduce broadband bandwidth tariffs and rates and improve quality in order to maintain international competitiveness.
 Plan, develop and establish "Software Technology Parks" and IT Parks in Pakistan
 Determine human capital requirements of the IT industry and work to address these needs in collaboration with other entities.
 Develop and execute a marketing plan to help local software companies reach out to potential clients abroad, attract and facilitate foreign software firms to establish their software development facilities in Pakistan. Arrange the participation of Pakistani IT Industry in domestic and international IT events. Provide protocol, hosting and match-making facilities for foreign delegates and investors.
 Establish a web portal for customers, investors and companies and prepare and disseminate marketing collateral.
 Develop company capability by assisting them in acquiring quality, security and other certifications.
 Facilitate company growth by enabling access to equity and debt financing and by fostering an entrepreneurial culture.
 Undertake targeted development of sectors like ERP for Small and Medium Industry and Open Source Technologies to boost these sectors and create a snow ball affect.

Programs and Initiatives

International Marketing
Promotion of Pakistan's IT industry is the core activity of Pakistan Software Export Board (PSEB). IT companies have regularly benefited from PSEB initiatives by attracting valuable business leads, establishing offices in key foreign locations and signing joint venture agreements with foreign counterparts. World-renowned research authorities like Gartner, World Bank and McKinsey have continuously endorsed the international marketing activities of PSEB and have laid emphasis on increasing/enhancing the presence of Pakistani IT companies in key international markets which in turn will complement the IT oriented export revenue.

PSEB participates proactively in leading industry events in Europe, North America and the Middle East and facilitates the Pakistani IT/ITeS Industry by providing networking opportunities to the business and entrepreneurial community, these include GITEX, CeBIT, MWC, CHTF and Meftech etc. PSEB has also taken the initiative of conducting mini events (outbound delegations) to create matchmaking opportunities for the local IT companies abroad. Mini events are customer focused events where leading IT targeted groups gather and provide an opportunity to the visiting Pakistani IT companies to present their products and services. PSEB has successfully taken outbound delegations to UK, Canada, USA and Ireland.

Internship Program
Pakistan Software Export Board in collaboration with National ICT R&D Fund has launched a new internship program titled “Prime Minister’s ICT Internship Program”. Through this program, PSEB will place 3,000 ICT graduates with 16 or 18 years academic degrees who aim to develop a career in the ICT Industry. The goals of the project include:

Meet industry needs for recent graduates with relevant and latest training in most demanded areas as determined by the industry. To give an opportunity to the graduates of the country and make them contributing members of the ICT Industry & IT departments of public and private sector organizations.
This will be accomplished through a six-month internship at ICT Industry & IT departments of public and private sector organizations.

Interested companies and ICT graduates may apply online at http://www.internship.pseb.org.pk/internship/

Strategy & Research
In conjunction with stakeholders such as PASHA, the industry association, Planning Commission, State Bank of Pakistan, the IT/ITeS industry, and the Ministry of Information Technology, PSEB has developed a vision and a strategic road-map to fast-track the IT industry's growth.

Facilitation
PSEB facilitates IT companies in their interaction with various Government agencies, and also launches programs in areas of strategic importance. The facilitation services range from providing strategic insight and guidance regarding the sector's issues, to assisting the private-sector in visa assistance, and liaising with higher Government officials.

IT Parks

Pakistan Software Export Board is mandated to facilitate the Pakistani IT industry and encourage the software and services exports from Pakistan. One of the major functions of PSEB is to set up and operate Information Technology (IT) parks and provide conducive and enabling infrastructure for the development of the IT industry.

List of Software Houses currently registered in the US are Netsol, Techlogix, Tkxel, InfinixTech, Systems Limited, Xavor, and InvoZone

Data-Node Operations
Pakistan Software Export Board (PSEB) establishes Data Node at each STP to act as One Stop Shop to help IT & ITeS companies to start the operations in shortest possible time. This Data Nodes Network has proved really helpful in populating the STPs by providing first level customer services and high speed quality bandwidth services. Dedicated high-speed data connectivity acts as catalyst for rapid development of IT and ITeS companies.

Human Resource Development
Collaboration with the Higher Education Commission of Pakistan to increase quality graduates into the industry through specialized programs and training and certification courses for professionals in the IT industry. Initiation of an internship program that provided job placement to almost 3,300 professionals with eighty percent of them finding permanent employment.

Office Space Provision

Marketing and Public Relations
PSEB promotes the IT industry of Pakistan through trade show participation, email marketing, visits to foreign countries, mini events, and publication of articles in various international publications..

Certification for IT Companies
PSEB sponsors information security certification of IT companies by providing consultation and subsidy. Under this program of PSEB, more than hundred companies got an ISO-certification and 25 got CMMI certifications.

Services for IT industry
PSEB provides the following services for IT Companies in Pakistan.

 Business setup facilitation
 Participation in International Exhibitions
 IT delegations to target countries around the globe
 Infrastructure Support and office provision
 Software import and industrial Automation
 Open Source Resource Center
 Facilitation Meetings with prospect clients
 Visa and Travel Assistance for business travel

Board of Directors

 Federal Minister, Ministry of IT & Telecom, Government of Pakistan
 Secretary IT, Ministry of IT & Telecom, Government of Pakistan
 Chief Executive, Trade Development Authority of Pakistan (TDAP), Government of Pakistan
 Secretary Finance, Ministry of Finance, Government of Pakistan
 Managing Director, Pakistan Software Export Board (PSEB)
 Chairman, Pakistan Software Houses Association (PASHA)
 Industry Representative - Salim Ghauri

References

External links
 Official site

Pakistan federal departments and agencies
Information technology in Pakistan
1995 establishments in Pakistan
Government agencies established in 1995
Foreign trade of Pakistan